The Holbeck Hall Hotel was a clifftop hotel in Scarborough, North Yorkshire, England, owned by the Turner family. It was built in 1879 by George Alderson Smith as a private residence, and was later converted to a hotel.

On 4 June 1993,  of the  hotel garden had disappeared from view, the beginning of a landslide which gradually became more severe, and finally on 5 June 1993, after a day of heavy rain, parts of the building collapsed, making news around the world. The hotel's chimney stack collapsed live on television just as Yorkshire TV's Calendar regional news programme went on air covering the building's precarious condition. Richard Whiteley was presenting the item at the time of the collapse. The remainder of the building was demolished for safety reasons. One of the likely contributing causes of the landslide was the substantial rain in the two months before it occurred. The mud flow from the landslide protruded  beyond the high-water mark.

Landslides are a common problem in Scarborough and along the coast from Filey to Whitby.

In 1997, the hotel's collapse became the subject of a significant court case in English civil law (Holbeck Hall Hotel Ltd v Scarborough BC) when the owners of the hotel attempted to sue Scarborough Borough Council for damages, alleging that as owners of the shoreline they had not taken any practical measures at all to prevent the landslip – from soft, to hard engineering, nothing was done. The claim was rejected on the grounds that the Council was not liable for the causes of the slip because it was not reasonably foreseeable. Reasonable foreseeability is a requirement for liability in negligence and nuisance in English and Welsh tort law.

References

External links
 Image of hotel shortly after the collapse
 English Rose Hotels
 British Geological Survey case study of the Holbeck Hall landslip

Hotel buildings completed in 1879
Hotels in Scarborough, North Yorkshire
Defunct hotels in England
1879 establishments in England
1993 disestablishments in England
Landslides in the United Kingdom
Landslides in 1993
Demolished hotels in the United Kingdom